William Payne (Exeter 4 March 1760 – August 1830 London) was an English painter and etcher who invented the tint Payne's grey.

Life and work

Payne hit upon certain methods which considerably increased the resources of watercolour art, especially in the rendering of sunlight and atmosphere. His 'style,' as it was called, was one which was not only new and effective, but could be learnt without much difficulty, and he soon became the most fashionable drawing-master in London.

Among the innovations with which he is credited were "splitting the brush to give forms of foliage, dragging the tints to give texture to his foregrounds, and taking out the forms of lights by wetting the surface and rubbing with bread and rag". He also abandoned the use of outline with the pen, but the invention by which he is best known is a neutral tint composed of indigo, raw sienna, and lake called Payne's grey. His methods were regarded as tricky by the old-fashioned practitioners of the day. but there is no doubt that he did much to advance the technique of watercolour painting, and was one of the first 'draughtsmen' to abandon mere topography for a more poetical treatment of landscape scenery.

In 1809 he was elected an associate of the Watercolour Society, but left it after the reform of the original society in 1812. During the four years of his connection with the society he sent seventeen drawings to their exhibitions. By this time his art had changed to mannerism. He died in London in 1830.

References

Sources

Further reading
Long, Basil S. William Payne, water-colour painter working 1776-1830 (London, Walker's Galleries, 1922).
Hunt, Peter. Payne’s Devon (Exeter: Devon Books, 1986).
Japes, David. William Payne: A Plymouth Experience (Exeter: Royal Albert Memorial Museum, 1992).

External links

William Payne online (ArtCyclopedia)
W. Payne at the Tate (Tate Gallery)
Payne biography (The Armitt website)
Figures on a track above a bay (Christie's)
Landscape with trees (Christie's)

English landscape painters
English watercolourists
English etchers
1760 births
1830 deaths